Sanam Chandra Palace Railway Halt is a railway halt located in Phra Pathom Chedi Subdistrict, Nakhon Pathom City, Nakhon Pathom. It is located near Sanam Chandra Palace, and used to have a royal pavilion, however this was moved to Hua Hin Railway Station.

Train services 
 Ordinary 254/255 Lang Suan-Thon Buri-Lang Suan
 Ordinary 257/258 Thon Buri-Nam Tok-Thon Buri
 Ordinary 261/262 Bangkok-Hua Hin-Bangkok
 Ordinary 351/352 Thon Buri-Ratchaburi-Thon Buri
 Commuter 355/356 Bangkok-Suphan Buri-Bangkok

References 
 
 

Railway stations in Thailand